Pierluigi Conforti (born 15 June 1946) was an Italian Grand Prix motorcycle road racer. His best year was in 1977 when he won the 125cc British Grand Prix and finished in tenth place in the 125cc world championship.

References

1946 births
Living people
Italian motorcycle racers
125cc World Championship riders
250cc World Championship riders